Ruydar Rural District is a rural district (dehestan) in the Ruydar District of Khamir County, Hormozgan Province, Iran. At the 2006 census, its population (including Ruydar, which was subsequently detached from the rural district and promoted to city status) was 8,549, in 1,974 families; excluding Ruydar, the population (as of 2006) was 3,079, in 738 families.  The rural district has 11 villages.

References 

Rural Districts of Hormozgan Province
Khamir County